The 1946 United States Senate election in Delaware took place on November 5, 1946. Incumbent Democratic U.S. Senator James M. Tunnell ran for re-election to a second term in office, but was defeated by Republican John J. Williams, a businessman and member of the Millsboro Town Council.

General election

Candidates
James M. Tunnell, incumbent Senator since 1941 (Democratic)
John J. Williams, member of the Millsboro Town Council (Republican)

Results

See also 
 1946 United States Senate elections

References

Delaware
1946
1946 Delaware elections